Prostanthera staurophylla, commonly known as Tenterfield mint-bush,  is a species of flowering plant in the family Lamiaceae and is endemic to a small area on the New England Tableland of New South Wales. It is an erect to spreading, strongly aromatic shrub with hairy branches, deeply lobed leaves and bluish-mauve flowers with darker markings.

Description
Flowering occurs from August to December.

Taxonomy
Prostanthera staurophylla was first formally described in 1875 by Ferdinand von Mueller in Fragmenta Phytographiae Australiae from material collected between Tenterfield and  the Severn River by Charles Stuart.

Distribution and habitat
Tenterfield mint-bush is only known from near Tenterfield on the New England Tableland of New South Wales, where it grows in open and exposed places near granite outcrops with Kunzea and Leptospermum species. The discovery in 2001 by John T. Hunter and J.B. Williams of a specimen in the Mount Mackenzie Nature Reserve was the first record of the species in 130 years.

Conservation status
Prostanthera staurophylla is classified as "vulnerable" under the Australian Government Environment Protection and Biodiversity Conservation Act 1999 and as "endangered" under the New South Wales Government Biodiversity Conservation Act 2016. The main threats to the species include its small population size, grazing, disturbance by pigs and goats, trampling and illegal collection of wildflowers.

References

staurophylla
Lamiales of Australia
Taxa named by Ferdinand von Mueller
Plants described in 1875